North Shore is a neighborhood in Pittsburgh's North Side. Its zip code is 15212. 

It is home to Heinz Field, PNC Park, and The Andy Warhol Museum.

History and features
Developing rapidly around and between the two stadiums, the neighborhood has representation on Pittsburgh City Council by council members for District 1 (North Neighborhoods) and 6 (North Shore/Downtown Neighborhoods). 

Two new light rail stations opened in the spring of 2012. The North Side station is located beside PNC Park and near the north portal of the Allegheny River Tunnel. Allegheny station is located by Heinz Field, and is the current western terminus of the line.

Future development
In October 2014, two 11-story office skyscrapers were proposed for the area by local parking lot manager Alco Parking. The project is likely to move forward, as soon as an anchor tenant can be found.

Surrounding and adjacent Pittsburgh neighborhoods
North Shore runs along the Allegheny River and its confluence with the Monongahela River to form the Ohio River.  It is bordered by Chateau to the west, Allegheny West to the northwest, Allegheny Center to the north, East Allegheny to the northeast, and Troy Hill to the east.  The Roberto Clemente, Andy Warhol, and Rachel Carson Bridges provide direct links to Downtown Pittsburgh as do the first southbound exits across the Veterans and Fort Duquesne Bridges.

See also
List of Pittsburgh neighborhoods

References

Gallery

External links
Interactive Pittsburgh Neighborhoods Map 

Neighborhoods in Pittsburgh
Economy of Pittsburgh
Pittsburgh History & Landmarks Foundation Historic Landmarks
Entertainment districts in the United States